In functional analysis and related areas of mathematics, distinguished spaces are topological vector spaces (TVSs) having the property that weak-* bounded subsets of their biduals (that is, the strong dual space of their strong dual space) are contained in the weak-* closure of some bounded subset of the bidual.

Definition

A Hausdorff locally convex space  is called a distinguished space if it satisfies any of the following equivalent conditions: 

If  is a -bounded subset of  then there exists a bounded subset  of  whose -closure contains .

If in addition  is a metrizable locally convex topological vector space then this list may be extended to include: 

Sufficient conditions

All normed spaces and semi-reflexive spaces are distinguished spaces. 
LF spaces are distinguished spaces.  

The strong dual space  of a Fréchet space  is distinguished if and only if  is quasibarrelled.

Properties

Every locally convex distinguished space is an H-space.

Examples

There exist distinguished Banach spaces spaces that are not semi-reflexive. 
The strong dual of a distinguished Banach space is not necessarily separable;  is such a space. 
The strong dual space of a distinguished Fréchet space is not necessarily metrizable.
There exists a distinguished semi-reflexive non-reflexive -quasibarrelled Mackey space  whose strong dual is a non-reflexive Banach space.  
There exist H-spaces that are not distinguished spaces.  

Fréchet Montel spaces are distinguished spaces.

See also

References

Bibliography

 
  
  
  
  
  
  
  

Topological vector spaces